The 1898 William & Mary Orange and White football team represented the College of William & Mary during the 1898 college football season. The season marked the first meeting between William & Mary and the University of Richmond, which later became known as the I-64 Bowl—so named for the highway between the two nearby schools—and eventually as the Capital Cup. Richmond won the inaugural contest 15–0.

Schedule

References

William and Mary
William & Mary Tribe football seasons
William and Mary Orange and White football